Temesgen Tiruneh is the director general of Ethiopia's National Intelligence and Security Service.

On 8 November 2020, Temesgen Tiruneh was appointed to the position of director general of NISS by Prime Minister Abiy Ahmed, in the midst of the Tigray War. He was the former president of Amhara state. He was replaced from his former position of Amhara regional state president by Agegnehu Teshager.

Director of the National Intelligence and Security Service 
Tiruneh as the director of the leading intelligence agency has said many statements of security treat. He publicly said that "The TPLF Junta dreamt of disrupting the central government by mobilizing its lapdogs it dubbed “Federalist Forces”, but, things have gone the other way around as all Ethiopians stand in unison against it.” 
Temesgen also made another statement vowing to destroy the TPLF from the face of the earth. He also said that the NISS was teaming up with the Federal Police and the National Defense force to defeat the terrorist TPLF. Temesgen said in a statement  “This divisive rhetoric is TPLF’s destructive tool that it has been implementing since its very inception." He also said the TPLF are not here to destroy the Amhara people but the whole nation as a whole.

References 

Ethiopian government officials
Living people
Year of birth missing (living people)